The Fate of Liberty: Abraham Lincoln and Civil Liberties is a 1991 book by American historian Mark E. Neely, Jr., published by Oxford University Press. The book examines President Abraham Lincoln's suspension of habeas corpus and other rights during the American Civil War.

The book was awarded the 1992 Pulitzer Prize for History.

References 

1991 non-fiction books
American history books
Books about Abraham Lincoln
Pulitzer Prize for History-winning works
Oxford University Press books
20th-century history books